Adrián Menéndez Maceiras and Sergiy Stakhovsky were the defending champions but withdrew before their quarterfinal match.

Andrés Artuñedo and David Pérez Sanz won the title after defeating Matías Franco Descotte and João Monteiro 6–7(3–7), 6–3, [10–6] in the final.

Seeds

Draw

References
 Main Draw

Open Castilla y León - Men's Doubles
2018 Men's Doubles
2018 Open Castilla y León